Antoine Hamid Mourany (in Arabic:أنطوان حميد موراني, January 24, 1930, in Al Qoubaiyat, Lebanon – April 16, 2012) was an archbishop of the Maronite Catholic Archeparchy of Damascus.

Life

Ordained priest on 11 June 1960, Mourany was elected bishop on 5 June 1989 by the Maronite Synod to the Archeparchy of Damascus. Maronite Patriarch of Antioch, Nasrallah Boutros Sfeir, gave him his episcopal ordination on September 16 of the same year, and his co-consecrators were Joseph Merhi, CML, Eparch of Cairo, and Georges Abi-Saber, OLM, auxiliary bishop in Antioch.

On 10 March 1999 Mourany resigned from his duties as archeparch.

Notes

External links
 http://www.catholic-hierarchy.org/bishop/bmourany.html Antoine Hamid Mourany

Lebanese Maronites
20th-century Maronite Catholic bishops
1930 births
2012 deaths